The 5th Siberian Army Corps was an Army corps in the Imperial Russian Army.

The formation was formed, in 1904, from the 54th reserve brigade of the Kazan Military District, deployed in a corps consisting of two divisions during the Russian-Japanese war of 1904–1905.
The corps staff was formed on the basis of the headquarters of the 54th reserve brigade. The corps divisions received numbers 54th and 71st infantry.

In 1910 it was re-formed.

Composition
1904:
54th Infantry Division
71st Infantry Division
1914:
3rd Siberian Rifle Division
6th Siberian Rifle Division

Part of
Amur Military District: 1904–06.1914
1st Army: 10.1914 – 01.1915
2nd Army: 02.1915 – 09.1915
4th Army: 09.1915 – 02.1916
12th Army: 03.1916 – 04.1916
6th Army: 04.1916 – 05.1916
8th Army: 06.1916 – 07.1916
11th Army: 07.1916 – 1917

Commanders
01.1904-05.1906: Leonid Dembowsky
06.1910-07.1911: Nikolai Podvalnyuk 
09.1911-12.1913: Pavel Savvich
12.1913-02.1914: Arkady Sychevsky 
02.1914-12.1914: Leonty Sidorin
12.1914-04.1917: Nikolai Voronov,  
04.1917-11.1917: Alexander Turbin, 
11.1917-02.1918: Captain Alexander Todorsky

Sources 
 the article in the Russian Wikipedia, 5-й Сибирский армейский корпус.''

 
 

Corps of the Russian Empire